Robert Hardy "Bake" Turner (born July 22, 1940) is a former American football player who played at the wide receiver position.  He played collegiately at Texas Technological College (now Texas Tech University), then professionally for nine seasons.  He was with the New York Jets of the American Football League, where in 1963 he replaced Art Powell who had been traded to the Oakland Raiders.  He was a member of the Jets' AFL and Super Bowl III teams after the 1968 Pro Football season, and also played for the Baltimore Colts and Boston Patriots of the National Football League.

College career 
Turner played as a running back while playing for Texas Tech.

Freshman season 
In 1959, Turner had 25 attempts for 86 yards and one touchdown. Receiving wise, Turner had 22 receptions for 444 yards, which averaged 20.2 yards per reception, the best in the NCAA. He also caught 3 touchdowns.

Sophomore season 
Turner improved his rushing yard total to 36 attempts for 150 yards and one touchdown. However, he decreased his receiving yards, with only 9 receptions for 173 receiving yards.

Junior season 
Turner, yet again, increased his total rushing yards for the season, with 41 attempts for 185 yards and one touchdown. He only had 3 receptions for 30 yards.

Statistics

Professional career 
Turner forwent his senior season and entered the 1962 NFL Draft, where he was drafted by the Baltimore Colts in the 12th round (163rd overall).

Baltimore Colts 
With the Colts, Turner was primarily used as a return specialist, with 504 kick return yards on 20 attempts and 95 punt return yards on 10 attempts. Turner rushed for 17 yards on 1 attempt. Turner received for 111 yards on one attempt, and one touchdown. However, those 111 yards came from two plays. In a game against the Bears, Lamar McHan completed a pass to RC Owens at the 40-yard line. Owens then lateralled the ball to Turner, who ran all the way to the 3-yard line. Owens was credited with the catch, and Turner had 0 receptions for 37 yards. In the final game of the season, Turner had a touchdown reception for 74 yards. Turner finished the season with an average of 111 yards per reception.

New York Jets 
Turner spent most of his career with the New York Jets. In 1963, his first year with the team, Turner was selected to the AFL All-Star Game after catching 71 receptions for 1,009 yards, with 6 touchdowns. Turner received 14 kick returns for 299 yards, as well. Along with being an All-Star, Turner was selected as the team MVP. In 1964, Turner caught 58 passes for 974 yards and 9 touchdowns. In 1965, Turner caught 31 passes for 402 yards and 2 touchdowns and returned 18 kicks for 402 yards. In 1966, Turner caught 7 passes for 115 yards, returned 10 punts for 60 yards, and returned 2 kicks for 50 yards. In 1967, Turner caught only 3 passes for 40 yards and returned 4 kicks for 40 yards. In the Jets' Super Bowl-winning season in 1968, Turner caught 10 passes for 241 yards and 2 touchdowns and returned 14 kicks for 319 yards. In Turner's final season as a Jet in 1969, Turner caught 11 passes for 221 yards and 3 touchdowns and returned 3 kicks for 74 yards.

Boston Patriots 
After the 1969 season, Turner was traded to the Boston Patriots, where he spent one season. That season was a fairly successful one, with 28 receptions for 428 yards and 2 touchdowns. Turner retired after that season.

References

See also
 Other American Football League players

1940 births
Living people
People from Alpine, Texas
Players of American football from Texas
American football wide receivers
Texas Tech Red Raiders football players
Baltimore Colts players
New York Jets players
Boston Patriots players
American Football League players
American Football League All-Star players